T. ehrenbergii may refer to:

 Tigridia ehrenbergii, a shell flower
 Tolyposporium ehrenbergi, a smut fungus
 Tragacantha ehrenbergii, a terrestrial plant